1988 Summer Olympics Album: One Moment in Time (titled as just One Moment in Time for some releases) is a compilation album that was released to coincide with the 1988 Summer Olympics in Seoul, South Korea. The album was released on August 30, 1988 by Arista Records. The album features songs by some of the most popular artists at the time of the album's release, including the title track, "One Moment in Time" by Whitney Houston.

Track listing

US edition

Original track listing order. Song list order differed on various album covers.
 "Olympic Spirit" – John Williams
 "One Moment in Time" – Whitney Houston
 "Fight (No Matter How Long)" – The Bunburys
 "Indestructible" – Four Tops
 "Reason to Try" – Eric Carmen
 "Shape of Things to Come" – Bee Gees
 "Peace in Our Time" – Jennifer Holliday
 "Willpower" – Taylor Dayne
 "That's What Dreams Are Made of" – Odds & Ends (Llory McDonald (vocals), Jim Vallance, Dave Plenn)
 "Harvest for the World" – The Christians
 "Rise to the Occasion" – Jermaine Jackson & La La (not on LP)
 "Olympic Joy" – Kashif

Brazil, Greece editions

The track listing varies depending on country of release.

 "Olympic Spirit" – John Williams
 "One Moment in Time" – Whitney Houston
 "Fight (No Matter How Long)" – The Bunburys
 "Indestructible" – Four Tops
 "Reason to Try" – Eric Carmen
 "Shape of Things to Come" – Bee Gees
 "Peace in Our Time" – Jennifer Holliday
 "Willpower" – Taylor Dayne
 "That's What Dreams Are Made of" – Odds & Ends
 "Harvest for the World" – The Christians
 "Olympic Joy" – Kashif

Personnel
Dick Bouchard, Jeff Lancaster – design
Clive Davis – executive producer
John Forsman – photography
Gary Borman – executive music supervisor

Certifications

References

1988 compilation albums
Arista Records albums
Olympic albums
1988 Summer Olympics